La Source (translated The Source) is the fourth album from the French R&B singer Nâdiya. The album was released on November 12, 2007, and is a hits compilation. In total, the album features 5 new songs, including the first single "Vivre ou survivre", and new versions of several songs from her previous two albums. No songs from her debut album Changer les Choses were included on the album.

Track listing

Charts, certifications and sales
The album debuted at number 35 in the French charts upon release. After that, it kept on lowering in chart positions, leaving the top 100 within four weeks.

References

Nâdiya albums
2007 greatest hits albums